The 1976–77 Boston Celtics season was the 31st season of the Boston Celtics in the National Basketball Association (NBA).

Even though the Celtics were the defending NBA champions, they were an aging team in transition.  35-year-old Don Nelson retired as a player, but the key contributors left were aging, namely John Havlicek (age 36), Jo Jo White (31), and Paul Silas (33).  The Celtics took steps to get younger in the frontcourt by sending Silas to the Denver Nuggets in a three-way that ended up bringing Detroit Pistons forward Curtis Rowe.  The Celtics also traded a first-round draft pick to the Portland Trail Blazers for Sidney Wicks.  Wicks and Rowe would provide athleticism, the Celtics felt, and, more importantly, allow John Havlicek to return to a sixth-man role and not log as many minutes as in the past.

Draft picks

The Celtics picked 16th in the 1976 NBA draft and selected Norm Cook, a 6–8, 210-lb. junior-eligible forward from the University of Kansas.  Cook, however, did not contribute much, playing in only 25 games and averaging 2.5 points per game.

Roster

Regular season

The Celtics started the season 4-0 (with their first two games entering overtime, as well having another overtime game during their sixth game of the season), but Wicks and Rowe had trouble fitting in with Celtic coach Tom Heinsohn's system, and the team played .500 ball for most of the season. Charlie Scott suffered a broken foot and only played 31 games, which meant Havlicek had to log more minutes, primarily at off-guard.  Depth was a problem for the Celtics, as backup center Jim Ard was the only reliable reserve.  Havlicek, White, and Cowens carried most of the scoring load for the team all season.

Season standings

Record vs. opponents

Playoffs

|- align="center" bgcolor="#ccffcc"
| 1
| April 12
| San Antonio
| W 104–94
| Jo Jo White (24)
| Dave Cowens (13)
| Dave Cowens (7)
| Boston Garden13,505
| 1–0
|- align="center" bgcolor="#ccffcc"
| 2
| April 15
| @ San Antonio
| W 113–109
| Jo Jo White (38)
| Sidney Wicks (12)
| Cowens, Havlicek (9)
| HemisFair Arena12,067
| 2–0
|-

|- align="center" bgcolor="#ccffcc"
| 1
| April 17
| @ Philadelphia
| W 113–111
| Charlie Scott (22)
| Dave Cowens (15)
| Charlie Scott (8)
| Spectrum13,821
| 1–0
|- align="center" bgcolor="#ffcccc"
| 2
| April 20
| @ Philadelphia
| L 101–113
| John Havlicek (31)
| Dave Cowens (15)
| Jo Jo White (7)
| Spectrum18,276
| 1–1
|- align="center" bgcolor="#ffcccc"
| 3
| April 22
| Philadelphia
| L 100–109
| John Havlicek (25)
| Wicks, Cowens (8)
| Jo Jo White (7)
| Boston Garden15,040
| 1–2
|- align="center" bgcolor="#ccffcc"
| 4
| April 24
| Philadelphia
| W 124–119
| Dave Cowens (37)
| Dave Cowens (21)
| John Havlicek (15)
| Boston Garden15,040
| 2–2
|- align="center" bgcolor="#ffcccc"
| 5
| April 27
| @ Philadelphia
| L 91–110
| Charlie Scott (20)
| Curtis Rowe (16)
| Jo Jo White (7)
| Spectrum18,276
| 2–3
|- align="center" bgcolor="#ccffcc"
| 6
| April 29
| Philadelphia
| W 113–108
| Jo Jo White (40)
| Dave Cowens (19)
| John Havlicek (6)
| Boston Garden15,040
| 3–3
|- align="center" bgcolor="#ffcccc"
| 7
| May 1
| @ Philadelphia
| L 77–83
| Jo Jo White (17)
| Dave Cowens (27)
| Charlie Scott (6)
| Spectrum18,276
| 3–4
|-

References

Boston Celtics seasons
Boston Celtics
Boston Celtics
Boston Celtics
Celtics
Celtics